Tretter may refer to

People

Surname
 Tretter (surname), with a list of people so named.

Other uses
 Jean-Nickolaus Tretter Collection in Gay, Lesbian, Bisexual and Transgender Studies